The 2009 Basque regional election was held on Sunday, 1 March 2009, to elect the 9th Parliament of the Basque Autonomous Community. All 75 seats in the Parliament were up for election. The election was held simultaneously with a regional election in Galicia. It would be the first time that the elections for two of the Spanish "historical regions"—namely, those comprising Andalusia, Catalonia, Galicia and the Basque Country itself—were held simultaneously. This would evolve into an unwritten convention in subsequent years, with Basque and Galician elections being held concurrently in 2012, 2016 and 2020.

The 2009 Basque election was the first one to be held without any major electoral candidacy from the abertzale left, after their previous iterations—the Communist Party of the Basque Homelands (PCTV/EHAK) and Basque Nationalist Action (ANV)—had been outlawed in September 2008 because of their reported ties to ETA and the outlawed Batasuna party. In early February 2009, two political groupings formed by abertzale left members to contest the election, Demokrazia Hiru Milioi (D3M) and Askatasuna ("Freedom"), were barred from contesting the election by both the Supreme Court and the Constitutional Court. In response, the abertzale left asked their voters to cast invalid ballots, both in protest to the court rulings and seeking to prevent tactical voting in favour of either Lehendakari Juan José Ibarretxe's Basque Nationalist Party (PNV) or Eusko Alkartasuna (EA).

The election resulted in an upset, as Basque nationalist parties lost their parliamentary majority for the first time in 30 years, paving the way for a non-PNV led government. The Socialist Party of the Basque Country–Basque Country Left (PSE–EE) under Patxi López gained seven seats to command a 25-strong caucus, the best historical showing of the party in a Basque regional election. The People's Party (PP), which had switched leaders less than a year before the election as former leader María San Gil quit over disagreements with the national leadership of Mariano Rajoy, had a net loss of two seats from 2005. The new Union, Progress and Democracy (UPyD) party, founded in 2007 by former PSOE member and regional minister Rosa Díez was able to achieve a breakthrough in Álava and have its regional candidate Gorka Maneiro elected. Meanwhile, PNV's previous coalition partners, Eusko Alkartasuna (EA) and Ezker Batua (EB), suffered a harsh electoral downturn with both their leaders losing their seats and resigning in the aftermath of the election.

The PSE formed a minority government with López as the first non-PNV lehendakari since 1979 through a confidence and supply agreement with the PP. While both parties had established an uneasy alliance in the Basque Country since the late 1990s despite their overall national rivalry, this would constitute the most relevant agreement reached between both parties at any level of administration.

Overview

Electoral system
The Basque Parliament was the devolved, unicameral legislature of the autonomous community of the Basque Country, having legislative power in regional matters as defined by the Spanish Constitution of 1978 and the regional Statute of Autonomy, as well as the ability to vote confidence in or withdraw it from a lehendakari.

Voting for the Parliament was on the basis of universal suffrage, which comprised all nationals over 18 years of age, registered in the Basque Country and in full enjoyment of their political rights. The 75 members of the Basque Parliament were elected using the D'Hondt method and a closed list proportional representation, with an electoral threshold of three percent of valid votes—which included blank ballots—being applied in each constituency. Seats were allocated to constituencies, corresponding to the provinces of Álava, Biscay and Gipuzkoa, being allocated a fixed number of 25 seats each to provide for an equal representation of the three provinces in parliament as required under the regional statute of autonomy. This meant that Álava was allocated the same number of seats as Biscay and Gipuzkoa, despite their populations being, as of 1 January 2009: 315,280, 1,154,628 and 704,173, respectively.

The use of the D'Hondt method might result in a higher effective threshold, depending on the district magnitude.

Election date
The term of the Basque Parliament expired four years after the date of its previous election, unless it was dissolved earlier. The election decree was required to be issued no later than the twenty-fifth day prior to the date of expiry of parliament and published on the following day in the Official Gazette of the Basque Country (BOPV), with election day taking place on the fifty-fourth day from publication. The previous election was held on 17 April 2005, which meant that the legislature's term would have expired on 17 April 2009. The election decree was required to be published in the BOPV no later than 24 March 2009, with the election taking place on the fifty-fourth day from publication, setting the latest possible election date for the Parliament on Sunday, 17 May 2009.

The lehendakari had the prerogative to dissolve the Basque Parliament at any given time and call a snap election, provided that no motion of no confidence was in process. In the event of an investiture process failing to elect a lehendakari within a sixty-day period from the Parliament re-assembly, the Parliament was to be dissolved and a fresh election called.

Lehendakari Ibarretxe had been scheduled to announce a snap election for autumn 2008 following his expected failure in holding a proposed referendum on the Basque Country's political status for 25 October 2008, to be averted by the Spanish government. The electoral defeat of the Basque Nationalist Party (PNV) in the 2008 Spanish general election in the region and internal opposition from the PNV leadership to an immediate election delayed the scheduled snap vote to early 2009. Finally on 3 January 2009, Ibarretxe took advantage of Galician president Emilio Pérez Touriño's previous announcement of a Galician election for 1 March to call the Basque election simultaneously, a move which was interpreted by the media and by political parties as intending to caught his political rivals by surprise (particularly, the Spanish Socialist Workers' Party (PSOE) and the People's Party (PP), by forcing them to run two simultaneous election campaigns).

Background
The Ibarretxe Plan, a major proposal by Lehendakari Juan José Ibarretxe to reform the 1979 Basque Statute of Autonomy and turn the region into an associated state to Spain as a way to ending the ongoing conflict with the paramilitary ETA group, was brought to a standstill following its parliamentary defeat in a vote in the Congress of Deputies on 1 February 2005 and the subsequent electoral setback of Ibarretxe's coalition in the April 2005 regional election. On 22 March 2006, ETA declared a "permanent ceasefire" to allow for a peace process to ensue with the Spanish government under then-Prime Minister José Luis Rodríguez Zapatero, but peace talks terminated as a result of the 2006 Madrid–Barajas Airport bombing on 30 December.

Later into the legislature on 28 September 2007, Ibarretxe attempted to revive his statute reform plan by announcing a new "right to decide roadmap" which provided for a referendum on the proposal being held by 25 October 2008, whether it was in agreement with the Spanish government or without it. The law establishing the legal framework allowing the Basque government to hold the vote was approved by the Basque Parliament in June 2008, but was subsequently suspended and overturned by the Constitutional Court, which ended up ruling that the law and the proposed referendum were unconstitutional.

On 31 August 2006, the leadership of Eusko Alkartasuna (EA) had voted for terminating their electoral alliance with the Basque Nationalist Party (PNV) ahead of the 2007 foral and local elections, after seven years of collaboration; on 10 November 2008, the decision was made irreversible after EA announced its maintainment ahead of the incoming 2009 regional election. The 2007 elections had seen strong gains for the Socialist Party of the Basque Country–Basque Country Left (PSE–EE) and a decline for the parties supporting Ibarretxe's government, PNV, EA and Ezker Batua (EB), a situation confirmed one year later in the 2008 Spanish general election in the region as the PSE–EE emerged as the most voted party with 38.1% and 9 out of 18 Congress seats.

Concurrently, and in application of the 2002 Law of Political Parties—which allowed the outlawing of parties "whose activity violates democratic principles, particularly when it seeks to deteriorate or destroy the regime of freedoms or prevent or eliminate the democratic system by promoting, justifying or exculpating attacks on the life or integrity of people, legitimizing violence as a method to achieve political objectives or politically supporting the action of terrorist organizations to achieve their purposes of subverting the constitutional order"—the Supreme Court and the Constitutional Court barred several parties from contesting elections because of their reported ties to ETA and the outlawed Batasuna party; namely, the Communist Party of the Basque Homelands (PCTV/EHAK), Basque Nationalist Action (ANV), several groupings created specifically to contest the 2007 local elections (such as Abertzale Sozialisten Batasuna and Abertzale Sozialistak) or the 2009 regional election (Demokrazia Hiru Milioi and Askatasuna).

Parliamentary composition
The Basque Parliament was officially dissolved on 6 January 2009, after the publication of the dissolution decree in the Official Gazette of the Basque Country. The table below shows the composition of the parliamentary groups in the chamber at the time of dissolution.

Parties and candidates
The electoral law allowed for parties and federations registered in the interior ministry, coalitions and groupings of electors to present lists of candidates. Parties and federations intending to form a coalition ahead of an election were required to inform the relevant Electoral Commission within ten days of the election call, whereas groupings of electors needed to secure the signature of at least one percent of the electorate in the constituencies for which they sought election, disallowing electors from signing for more than one list of candidates.

Below is a list of the main parties and electoral alliances which contested the election:

Opinion polls
The table below lists voting intention estimates in reverse chronological order, showing the most recent first and using the dates when the survey fieldwork was done, as opposed to the date of publication. Where the fieldwork dates are unknown, the date of publication is given instead. The highest percentage figure in each polling survey is displayed with its background shaded in the leading party's colour. If a tie ensues, this is applied to the figures with the highest percentages. The "Lead" column on the right shows the percentage-point difference between the parties with the highest percentages in a poll. When available, seat projections determined by the polling organisations are displayed below (or in place of) the percentages in a smaller font; 38 seats were required for an absolute majority in the Basque Parliament.

Results

Overall

Distribution by constituency

Aftermath

Invalid votes
After Demokrazia Hiru Milioi (D3M) and Askatasuna ("Freedom") were outlawed in February 2009, Basque separatists were asked to cast their vote for D3M, whose ballots would be counted as invalid. According to some sources, the pro-independence Basque left (that were formerly represented by Batasuna and later by EHAK) was surprised by the lower support of their void option. If the void votes are to be counted as the support of this option, it would have obtained the worst results in their history, having received 100,924 void votes, 50,000 less than in the previous regional election and less than half their historical top in the 1998 election.

Major electoral analysis has been performed on the results and the issue of the void votes by pro-Basque nationalist and non-Basque nationalist parties alike. It is a frequent misunderstanding that, had the votes for the illegal lists been counted as valid, they would have been entitled to seven seats. Actually, taking into account that the average of "normal" void votes (struck-out names, double-voting, etc.) in the last three Basque regional elections (1998, 2001 and 2005) was about 0.4%, and assuming that all the void votes that could not be accounted for by that statistic alone were cast for a hypothetical unitary abertzale list (instead of for two different lists, Askatasuna and D3M), those ~97,000 votes would have accounted for at most 6 seats.

Government formation
The election results saw the Basque Nationalist Party (PNV) of Lehendakari Juan José Ibarretxe securing a clear victory with 38.1% of the vote and 30 seats, but it came at the expense of Ibarretxe's erstwhile allies, Eusko Alkartasuna (EA) and Ezker Batua (EB). Together with Aralar, which had seen a remarkable rise of support in absence of electoral competition from other abertzale left parties—a result of their illegalization because of their ties with ETA and Batasuna—the parties in support of Ibarretxe could only muster 36 out of the 75 seats in the Basque Parliament, against 39 of the combined totals for the Socialist Party of the Basque Country–Basque Country Left (PSE–EE), the People's Party (PP) and Union, Progress and Democracy (UPyD), meaning that for the first time since 1979 the possibility existed for a non-PNV lehendakari to be appointed. Upon learning of the results, PP regional leader Antonio Basagoiti proclaimed his satisfaction and announced his support for Socialist Patxi López as new lehendakari, who had previously announced that he felt "legitimated to lead the change" and would be running for investiture.

As the PNV–EA–EB alliance—in government since 2001—was no longer workable, the PNV attempted to figure out a coalition agreement with the PSE to remain in power, mirroring the historical collaboration that the two parties had maintained from 1986 to 1998, and hinting at withdrawing PNV's support to Prime Minister José Luis Rodríguez Zapatero's government in the Cortes Generales if the Spanish Socialist Workers' Party (PSOE) did not back their plan. The PSE rejected supporting a new PNV administration even if Ibarretxe was replaced with a different candidate, conditioning any agreement on Patxi López becoming lehendakari, which the PNV refused. Instead, the PSE proposed the formation of a minority cabinet led by López that could be supported by the PP, ruling out a full-fledged coalition. Concurrently, the PSOE's national leadership supported López's bid and defended the PSE's autonomy to agree on any pact that their local branch deemed fit, despite the PNV's threat of withdrawing their support nationally.

Seeking to provide the new government of parliamentary stability, the PSE and the PP—which had been and still were arch-rivals at the national level—reached an unprecedented confidence and supply agreement on 30 March that would see the Basque nationalists ousted from power after 30 years of uninterrupted government. The PNV, which had dubbed any such agreement as "legitimate" but as a "fraud to the electorate" and an "act of political aggression", announced a "harsh" opposition to López's government and vowed to put forth Ibarretxe as their candidate in the investiture session, citing their "right" to head the government as the top-voted party. As part of their agreement, the PSE would support PP's Arantza Quiroga as new president of the Basque Parliament and treat the PP as their "preferred" parliamentary partner, whereas the PP would refrain from moving or supporting any vote of no confidence on the new cabinet.

López was elected as new lehendakari on a 39–35 vote in the investiture session held on 5 May 2009, garnering the additional support of the sole legislator from Union, Progress and Democracy (UPyD), and was sworn in two days later. Simultaneously, his political defeat led Ibarretxe to announce his farewell from politics altogether, a move which would allow his party to reorganize itself from opposition hands-free and, eventually, lead to the abandonment of Ibarretxe's sovereigntist plans and discourse.

Notes

References
Opinion poll sources

Other

2009 in the Basque Country (autonomous community)
Basque Country
Regional elections in the Basque Country (autonomous community)
March 2009 events in Europe